Osborne Park is a former urban place on the North Shore of Sydney in the state of New South Wales, Australia. Osborne Park was located in the eastern part of the suburb of Lane Cove.  Its designation as an urban place was withdrawn in 1999.

The locality was called after 'Osborne Park' (later called 'Kermadec') in Osborne Rd, built by the future Prime Minister, Billy Hughes in 1906.

The Osborne Park Progress Association, founded in 1926, has developed tennis courts and other projects for community benefit.

External links
 Lane Cove Bushcare: Osborne Park Group

References

Sydney localities
Lane Cove Council